Zuhayr Talib Abd al-Sattar al-Naqib (1948 – 15 June 2020) was the last director of military intelligence in Iraq before the 2003 invasion US-led of Iraq.

Biography
He surrendered himself to Lieutenant Brian Wirtz (1-41 FA, 3ID) on 23 April 2003.  He was the "seven of hearts" on the most-wanted Iraqi playing cards developed by the United States-led coalition.

He suffered from vision loss while in prison. He died on 15 June 2020 in Amman, Jordan.

References

External links

1948 births
2020 deaths
Iraqi military personnel
Military leaders of the Iraq War
Arab Socialist Ba'ath Party – Iraq Region politicians
Prisoners and detainees of the United States military
Most-wanted Iraqi playing cards
Iraq War prisoners of war
Iraqi prisoners of war